Howard Powell Sant-Roos Olano (born February 13, 1991) is a Cuban professional basketball player for Casademont Zaragoza of the Liga ACB. At a height of 2.01 m (6'7") tall, he plays at the small forward position, but he can also operate as a point guard.

Early career
Sant-Roos began playing club basketball at the youth and amateur levels in Italy. Sant-Roos started his pro career in 2011, in the German 3rd Division, with SG Braunschweig; the farm team of the German 1st Division (BBL) team Phantoms Braunschweig. He was coached there by Kostas Flevarakis.

Professional career

ČEZ Nymburk (2015–2017)
On June 29, 2015, Sant-Roos signed a two-year deal with the Czech team ČEZ Nymburk. Sant-Roos helped the team to win the Czech Cup in 2017, and the Czech League titles in 2016 and 2017. On June 30, 2017, Sant-Roos joined the NBA's Denver Nuggets' Summer League roster, for the 2017 NBA Summer League.

Darüşşafaka (2017–2018)
On July 20, 2017, Sant-Roos signed a one-year deal with the Turkish Super League team Darüşşafaka. In 52 combined league games played (Turkish BSL and EuroCup) during the 2017–18 season, he averaged 7.3 points, 4.6 rebounds and 3.6 assists in the Turkish BSL season, and 8.6 points, 4.2 rebounds and 3.9 assists in the EuroCup season. Sant-Roos won the 2018 EuroCup with Daçka.

AEK Athens (2018–2020)
On August 3, 2018, Sant-Roos signed with the Greek Basket League team AEK Athens, for the 2018–19 season. With the Greek club, he won the FIBA Intercontinental Cup in 2019 and gained the reputation of being the best perimeter defender of the team. He averaged 6.6 points, 2.4 assists and 1.2 steals with AEK in the Greek League. On July 14, 2019, Sant-Roos renewed his contract with the Greek club through 2021.

CSKA Moscow (2020)
On January 11, 2020, Sant-Roos officially signed with the Russian EuroLeague powerhouse CSKA Moscow through the 2022–23 season, after a buy-out of €500,000 was submitted to and accepted by AEK. On July 19, 2020, CSKA officially opted-out of their contract with Sant-Roos, releasing him in the process.

Panathinaikos (2020–2022)
On July 21, 2020, Sant-Roos signed with Greek Basket League powerhouse and six-times winner of the EuroLeague Panathinaikos for the 2020-2021 season, with an option for a second year. 

On August 16, 2021, he renewed his contract with the Greek club through 2023. During his second season with the Greens, in 32 league games, he averaged 7.2 points, 3.8 rebounds, 3.5 assists and 1.5 steals, playing around 24 minutes per contest. Additionally, in 31 EuroLeague games, he averaged 7.2 points, 3.1 rebounds, 2 assists and 1.2 steals, playing around 23 minutes per contest.

On August 24, 2022, Sant-Roos officially parted ways with the Greek club after two seasons.

Basket Zaragoza (2022–present)
On August 27, 2022, he has signed with Casademont Zaragoza of the Liga ACB.

Personal life
Howard was born on February 13, 1991, in the neighborhood of Santo Suárez, municipality October 10. As a boy, he grew up in a small house on Serrano Street, just around the corner of the San Carlos Sports Complex Court.

Career statistics

EuroLeague

|-
| style="text-align:left;"|2019–20
| style="text-align:left;"|CSKA Moscow
| 10 || 3 || 18.9 || .333 || .174 || .867 || 2.5 || 1.7 || 1.2 || .0 || 5.5 || 5.3
|-
| style="text-align:left;"|2020–21
| style="text-align:left;"rowspan=2|Panathinaikos
| 32 || 27 || 24.3 || .396 || .348 || .809 || 2.4 || 3.7 || 1.5 || .2 || 7.2 || 8.9
|-
| style="text-align:left;"|2021–22
| 31 || 22 || 23.4 || .406 || .253 || .821 || 3.1 || 2.0 || 1.2 || .2 || 7.2 || 8.5
|- class="sortbottom"
| style="text-align:center;" colspan=2| Career
| 73 || 52 || 23.2 || .392 || .294 || .822 || 2.7 || 2.7 || 1.3 || .2 || 6.9 || 8.2

Domestic leagues

|-
| align="left" | 2014–15
| align="left" | Novipiù Casale Monferrato
| Serie A2 Basket
| 28 || 32.8 || .440 || .322 || .748 || 6.1 || 4.0 || 2.1 || .6 || 14.9
|-
| align="left" | 2016–17
| align="left" | ČEZ Nymburk
| NBL Czech Republic
| 40 || 23.4 || .494 || .385 || .875 || 6.0 || 3.4 || 2.1 || .6 || 13.6
|-
| align="left" | 2018–19
| align="left" | AEK Athens B.C.
| Greek Basket League
| 34 || 26.4 || .427 || .323 || .787 || 4.4 || 2.5 || 1.2 || .4 || 7.7
|-
| align="left" | 2019–20
| align="left" | AEK Athens B.C.
| Greek Basket League
| 13 || 30.4 || .404 || .325 || .667 || 6.2 || 3.4 || 2.2 || .2 || 9.0
|-
| align="left" | 2020–21
| align="left" | Panathinaikos
| Greek Basket League
| 26 || 22.0 || .396 || .325 || .800 || 3.0 || 2.9 || 1.5 || .2 || 7.1
|-
|-class=sortbottom
| align="center" colspan=2 | Career
| All Leagues
| 173 || 26.0 || .438 || .342 || .802 || 4.6 || 3.3 || 1.7 || .4 || 10.1

Highlights and awards

Pro career
FIBA Intercontinental Cup champion: 2019
EuroCup champion: 2018
2 x Czech NBL champion: 2016, 2017
Czech Cup: 2017
Greek League winner: 2021
Greek Cup winner: 2021
Greek Super Cup winner: 2021

Individual
2x Greek Basket League Best Defender: 2018–19, 2020-21
 VTB United League Steals Leader (2016)
Basketball Champions League Game Day MVP: 2019–20 Game Day 9

References

External links
 EuroCup Profile (archive)
 EuroLeague profile
 Eurobasket.com Profile
 RealGM.com Profile
 Greek Basket League Profile
 Turkish Super League Profile

1991 births
Living people
AEK B.C. players
A.S. Junior Pallacanestro Casale players
Basket Zaragoza players
Basketball Löwen Braunschweig players
Basketball Nymburk players
Cuban expatriate basketball people in Greece
Cuban expatriate basketball people in Italy
Cuban expatriate sportspeople in Germany
Cuban expatriate sportspeople in Turkey
Cuban men's basketball players
Darüşşafaka Basketbol players
Liga ACB players
Panathinaikos B.C. players
PBC CSKA Moscow players
Point guards
Small forwards